The official results of the Women's 20 km Walk at the 2003 World Championships in Paris, France, held on 24 August 2003.

Medalists

Abbreviations
All times shown are in hours:minutes:seconds

Records

Intermediates

Final ranking

See also
Athletics at the 2003 Pan American Games - Women's 20 kilometres walk
2003 Race Walking Year Ranking

References
Results(  2009-05-14)
Die Leichtathletik-Statistik-Seite

H
Racewalking at the World Athletics Championships
2003 in women's athletics